The 2015–16 Regionalliga was the eighth season of the Regionalliga, the fourth under the new format, as the fourth tier of the German football league system. The champions of Regionalliga Nord – SV Werder Bremen II, the champions of the Regionalliga Nordost – 1. FC Magdeburg, and the champions of Regionalliga Bayern – Würzburger Kickers were promoted to the 3. Liga. Borussia Dortmund II, SpVgg Unterhaching and SSV Jahn Regensburg were relegated from 3. Liga.

Regionalliga Nord 
18 teams from the states of Bremen, Hamburg, Lower Saxony and Schleswig-Holstein competed in the fourth season of the reformed Regionalliga Nord. 15 teams were retained from the last season and 3 teams were promoted from the Oberliga – Niedersachsenliga champions SV Drochtersen/Assel and the two Regionalliga North promotion playoff winners VfV 06 Hildesheim, Niedersachsenliga runners-up, and TSV Schilksee, Schleswig-Holstein-Liga champions.

Top goalscorers 
The top scorers of the league:

Regionalliga Nordost 
18 teams from the states of Berlin, Brandenburg, Mecklenburg-Vorpommern, Saxony, Saxony-Anhalt and Thuringia competed in the fourth season of the reformed Regionalliga Nordost. 13 teams were retained from the last season and 5 teams that were promoted from the Oberliga. The league expanded to 18 teams from 16 as no other teams were relegated to Oberliga because of Union Berlin II's withdrawal and insolvency-stricken VFC Plauen's administrative relegation. FSV Optik Rathenow qualified by winning the NOFV-Oberliga Nord along with runners-up FC Schönberg 95, while RB Leipzig II also qualified by winning NOFV-Oberliga Süd along with runners-up FC Oberlausitz Neugersdorf. FSV 63 Luckenwalde of the northern division won the promotion playoff between the third placers of the two NOFV-Oberliga divisions.

Top goalscorers 
The top scorers of the league:

Regionalliga West 
19 teams from North Rhine-Westphalia competed in the fourth season of the reformed Regionalliga West; 14 teams were retained from the last season. FC Wegberg-Beeck won Oberliga Mittelrhein and SSVg Velbert the Oberliga Niederrhein. TuS Erndtebrück won the Oberliga Westfalen while Rot-Weiss Ahlen qualified as runners-up. Borussia Dortmund II was relegated from 3. Liga.

Westphalia DFB-Pokal play-off
As the Westphalian Football and Athletics Association is one of three regional associations with the most participating teams in their league competitions, they were allowed to enter a second team for the 2016–17 DFB-Pokal (in addition to the Westphalian Cup winners). A play-off took place between the best-placed eligible (non-reserve) Westphalian team of the Regionalliga West, Sportfreunde Lotte, and the best-placed eligible team of the 2015–16 Oberliga Westfalen, Sportfreunde Siegen, with the winners qualifying for the DFB-Pokal.

Top goalscorers 
The top scorers of the league:

Regionalliga Südwest 
18 teams from Baden-Württemberg, Hesse, Rhineland-Palatinate and Saarland competed in the fourth season of the Regionalliga Südwest. 14 teams were retained from last season and 4 teams were promoted from the Oberliga: SV Spielberg won the Oberliga Baden-Württemberg, Saar 05 Saarbrücken the Oberliga Rheinland-Pfalz/Saar and TSV Steinbach the Hessenliga. The second-placed teams of the other Oberligas had play-off matches which was won by Bahlinger SC.

Top goalscorers 
The top scorers of the league:

Regionalliga Bayern 
18 teams from Bavaria competed in the fourth season of the Regionalliga Bayern. 13 teams were retained from the last season. SpVgg Unterhaching and SSV Jahn Regensburg were relegated from the 3. Liga. 3 teams were promoted from the Bayernliga. Viktoria Aschaffenburg won Bayernliga Nord, TSV Rain 1896 the Bayernliga Süd, and FC Amberg won the promotion play-off.

Top goalscorers 
The top scorers of the league:

Promotion play-offs
The draw for the 2015–16 promotion play-offs was held on 3 April, with another draw between the Regionalliga Südwest teams held on 21 May 2016.

Summary
The first legs were played on 25 May, and the second legs were played on 29 May 2016.

|}

Matches
All times Central European Summer Time (UTC+2)

Jahn Regensburg won 2–1 on aggregate.

FSV Zwickau won 2–1 on aggregate.

Sportfreunde Lotte won 2–0 on aggregate.

References

External links
 Regionalliga  kicker.de
 The Regionalligas   DFB.de

2015-16
4
2015–16 in European fourth tier association football leagues